The Battle of Cape Kaliakra was the last naval battle of the Russo-Turkish War (1787–1792). It took place on 11 August 1791 off the coast of Cape Kaliakra, Bulgaria, in the Black Sea. Neither side lost a ship, but the Ottomans retreated to Istanbul afterward.

The Russian fleet under Admiral Fyodor Ushakov, of 15 ships of the line and two frigates (990 guns), and several small craft sailed from Sevastopol on 8 August, and at midday on 11 August encountered the Ottoman–Algerian fleet under Hussein Pasha of 18 ships of the line and 17 frigates (1,500–1,600 guns) and some smaller craft at anchor just south of Cape Kaliakra. Ushakov sailed, in three columns, from the northeast, between the Ottomans and the cape, despite the presence on the cape of several guns.

Admiral Said Ali, the commander of the Algerian ships, weighed anchor and sailed east, followed by Hussein Pasha with the 18 ships of the line. The Russians then turned around south to a parallel east-south-east course and formed up mostly into one line, with Ushakov in third position and one ship out of line on the off-battle side. Said Ali, leading the line, turned north to try to double the Russian van, but Ushakov sailed out of the line and attacked him, as the rest of the Russian fleet approached. This was at 16:45 (4:45 p.m.). Gradually the Turks turned to the south and when darkness put an end to fighting at 20:30 (8:30 p.m.) they were in full retreat to Istanbul. Russian casualties were 17 killed and 28 wounded, and the frigate Alexander Nevsky was damaged. Ottoman casualty figures are unknown, but their ships were heavily damaged aloft.

Ships involved
Some of the Russian vessels involved and their crew were:

Russian Empire
 Rozhdestvo Christovo 84 (Nativity of Christ) (flagship)
 Ioann Predtecha 74 (John the Precursor)
 Maria Magdalina 66 (Mary Magdalene)
 Preobrazhenie Gospodne 66 (Transfiguration of the Lord)
 Pavel 66 (Saint Paul)
 Vladimir 66 (St Vladimir)
  64 (Saint Leontius)
 Alexander Nevsky''' 50 (Saint Alexander Nevsky)
 Andrei Pervozvannyi 50 (Saint Andrew the First-called)
 Nikolai 50 (Saint Nicholas)
 Feodor Stratilat 46 (Theodore Stratelates)
 Ioann Bogoslov 46 (John the Theologian)
 Navarchia Voznesenie Gospodne 46 (Navarchy Ascension of the Lord) 
 Pyotr 46 (Saint Peter)
 Tsar Konstantin 46 (Tsar Constantine)
 Fanagoria 40 (Phanagoria)
 Makropolea Sv. Mark Evangelist 36 (Mark the Evangelist)
 Rozhdestvo Christovo (Nativity of Christ) (bomb)
 Ieronim (Saint Jerome) (bomb)
 Panagia Apotumengana'' (Panagia of Taman) (privateer) 14
 16 privateers

Consequence
The battle occurred near the end of the Russian-Turkish war, which ended with the signing of the Jassy peace treaty.

The tactics used by Ushakov were an innovation in the theory of sea warfare. After that, a similar maneuver was used by Admiral Nelson in the Battle of Aboukir in 1798 and the Battle of Trafalgar in 1805.

For the victory at Cape Kaliakra, the Order of Saint Alexander Nevsky was awarded to Admiral Ushakov.

Citations

References

Sources
 

Conflicts in 1791
Naval battles involving Russia
Naval battles involving the Ottoman Empire
Naval battles of the Russo-Turkish War (1787–1792)
Military history of the Black Sea
Naval battles involving Ottoman Algeria